The Grub-Stake is a 1923 American silent Western film produced by and starring Nell Shipman. It was directed by Shipman's partner Bert Van Tuyle. It is considered an independent film.

Cast
 Nell Shipman as Faith Diggs
 Alfred Allen as Mark Leroy
 Walt Whitman as Skipper Diggs
 Lillian Leighton as Dawson Kate
 George Berrell as Malamute Mike
 Hugh Thompson as Jeb, Kate's son
 C. K. Van Auker as the mounty
 Ah Wing as Leroy's manservant
 Marjorie Warfield as art student
 Lloyd Peters

Preservation
A copy of The Grub-Stake is in the BFI National Archive.

References

External links

 
 

1923 films
1923 Western (genre) films
American black-and-white films
Silent American Western (genre) films
1920s American films
1920s English-language films